The Westfriese Omringdijk (West-Frisian Circular Dyke) is a dyke system that protected the region of Westflinge, part of the historical region of  West-Frisia. Westflinge is now commonly referred to as  West-Frisia as the rest of historical  West-Frisia assimilated with The Netherlands.

The cultivation of  peat bogs and  moors as of 1000 BC led to subsidence, which necessitated the building of  dykes. The Westfriese Omringdijk was formed by connecting a large number of smaller dykes. This was completed by 1250 AD, just in time for the area to be spared annihilation in the St. Lucia's flood of 1287. The total dyke length is about 126 km, protecting an area of about 800 km2. It connects the cities of Enkhuizen, Hoorn, Alkmaar, Schagen, Medemblik and then back to Enkhuizen.

Sources
Westfriese OmringDaik Sait
http://watercanon.nederlandleeftmetwater.nl/view/canon/dykeconstruction

Coastal construction
West Frisia
Dikes in the Netherlands
13th-century establishments in Europe